Sarah Gerau Powell (1922–1941) was an influential French poet of Jewish origin. Famous in large part for the impact she had on the early writing career of philosopher and novelist Simone de Beauvoir, Powell was killed in the Dachau concentration camp in 1941 following the Fall of France. Her life is best chronicled in English language texts today by J.J. Douglas.

Notable works
Powell's best known work was The Dwarf Boy Chronicles, which upon publication in early 1939 provoked much interest in Paris. The focus of interest in this poetry collection was held in the intellectual elite Left Bank area of Paris. Powell was a frequent visitor to such literary salons as Les Deux Magots and Le Flore, both of which lie on the Boulevard St. Germain and were regular haunts for Beauvoir and Sartre. 

Powell was acknowledged by the École Normale Supérieure (where she studied literature and philosophy) for her epic poem 'Rebecca the Clown', which was likely influenced by her college supervisor Rebecca Forde, with whom she later fell out. Beauvoir was also teaching in the Saint Germain-des-Pres district at this time.

Marriage and death
Powell met Lawrence Powell in January 1940, upon having visited London to promote her poetry collection. Lawrence Powell translated her work into English and she lived with him in his Kensington home in West London for several months before their marriage in April 1940. He was exempt from war duties as he was classified mentally unstable for combat, leading to them both moving back to Paris by May 1940. The timing was to prove fatal, with the German troops invading France and the Low Countries only weeks later. In the mass exodus from Paris, Sarah was captured by German troops when heading south towards the safe haven of Bordeaux. Lawrence was captured also, but his non-Jewish features were to ultimately save him. In the obituary he would later write for his wife, he stated that: "A love that obeyed no boundaries was what brought us together, but simply a Jewish face was what tore us apart." 

Sarah Powell was executed in the Dachau concentration camp in 1941 (the exact date is unknown). Her name can be found today on the wall of Holocaust victims in the Jewish Museum of Paris, Le Marais district. Another name to be found alongside hers is that of Natalie Costanza, her friend and collaborator, who accompanied Sarah on the exodus from Paris. Costanza's Jewish background also worked against her. Lawrence Powell would later pen a poem, I don't get it, about the women's deaths.

References

1922 births
1941 deaths
French Jews who died in the Holocaust
French women poets
French people who died in Dachau concentration camp
Date of death unknown
Date of birth unknown
Jewish poets
French civilians killed in World War II
20th-century French women writers
20th-century French poets
French people executed in Nazi concentration camps